Nasi uduk (Indonesian: "nasi uduk") is an Indonesian style steamed rice cooked in coconut milk dish, especially popular in Betawi cuisine.

Etymology

According to the book "Kuliner Betawi Selaksa Rasa & Cerita" (2016) composed by Akademi Kuliner Indonesia, the term uduk etymology derived from the term that means "difficult" or "struggle", which suggested that this rice dish was originally consumed by farmers and hard labourers.

Another theory suggests that the term uduk is related to the term aduk which means "mix", thus nasi uduk means "mixed rice".

On the other hand, some people connected the etymology to the Javanese traditions. Sultan Agung of Mataram called this rice dish wuduk, from Arabic word tawadhu''' which means being humble before God. Depending on the dialect used, it can be referred to as uduk or wuduk in Javanese. When a reference to its taste is made, it's called sega gurih (lit. savory rice).

History
According to the book "Makanan Khas Betawi” (2018) by Lilly T. Erwin, nasi uduk is a Betawi food that is quite popular and easy to find in almost all corners of Jakarta. Despite its current popularity in Jakarta area, historian suggested that the origin of this rice dish can be traced from the influence of two culinary traditions; Malay and Javanese. According to historians, there was historic trade and migration links connecting the port of Malacca and the port of Batavia, thus Malay traders and immigrants frequently visited Batavia, thus they brought nasi lemak cooking tradition into Batavia. Plus, there was Javanese settlers in Batavia that also familiar in cooking coconut rice. Moreover, after the fall of Portuguese Malacca to the Dutch in 1641, the link between two port cities were enforced tremendously since finally both belongs to the Dutch empire. The trace of the Malay people migration from Malay Peninsula and Sumatra into Batavia can be seen in the historic name of Kampung Melayu area in East Jakarta.

On the other hand, some historian suggested that nasi uduk was originated from Java. It was the brainchild of Sultan Agung of Mataram (Javanese ruler), inspired by his experience eating kebuli rice. According to Babad Tanah Jawa, Mataram sultans loved to eat "Arabic rice", which may refer to different types of pilaf or Arab-style rice. The phrase is often translated to kebuli (popular among Arabic descents in Indonesia) or biryani (an Indian Muslims dish) as these two dishes are the most commonly known among Javanese Muslims. Sultan Agung decided to make a local version of the "Arab dish", using local ingredients. He did this partly to reduce the state's expense (the cost to buy imported ingredients to make the above-mentioned dishes were very high) and to improve local pride.

Soon, sega uduk became a part of "syarat" (mandatory dish) in Javanese "gratitude" ceremonies, often called banca'an (alternative Latin spelling: bancakan) or slametan. Sega uduk can be found in a berkat,Berkat is a food package distributed during a slametan. a food package (usually contains rice, veggies, and side dishes), or served as a tumpeng, to be distributed after the ceremony. Sega uduk also becomes a required dish to be served during Wiwitan, a Javanese pre-harvest ritual.Uduk was introduced to Batavia by Javanese migrants in 1628, and later become popular dish in this region. Betawi people who sell this dish will often add a Betawi touch by adding semur jengkol. Uduk is also popular among Javanese diasporas in Suriname and the Netherlands.Nasi uduk is made by cooking rice soaked in coconut milk instead of water, along with clove, cassia bark, and lemongrass to add aroma. Sometimes knotted pandan leaves are thrown into the rice while steaming to give it more fragrance. The coconut milk and spices imparts an oily, rich taste to the rice. Bawang goreng (fried shallots) is sprinkled on top of the rice before serving. Other dishes are usually served as side dishes.

Depending on the occasion, uduk can be served "berkat style" in a woven bamboo box, wrapped in teak wood or banana leaves, or served as a large cone on a tampah (a rounded bamboo platter) as a tumpeng.

Side dishes

For certain rituals or ceremonies, uduk is usually served with traditional Javanese dishes like kering tempe, urap, and sambel goreng (kentang/potato, krecek/cow's skin, teri/anchovy, etc). Humble protein sources, such as, a hard boiled egg, fried tempeh, or fried tofu, can also be included in the package.

In today's slametan, modern Indonesian food dish (or from other regions), such as sliced fried egg, telur bumbu Bali (Balinese style egg), or rendang, may also be included. Some people may also add mie goreng or vermicelli into the dish. Krupuk, rempeyek, or emping can also be added.

Jakarta's's style uduk is a cross between Javanese's uduk and Melayu's nasi lemak. It may include jengkol (brown stinky beans) as a Betawi touch, and some elements of nasi lemak, such as teri-kacang (slightly similar to Javanese sambel goreng teri, except that it's not spicy).

Sambal may be used in a commercial uduk, but it's not prerequisite for a ritual/ceremonial uduk. In general, any types of sambal can be used as a condiment.

Nasi Uduk in Jakarta
Each neighbourhood in Jakarta has its own variant of the dish, the most notable being Nasi uduk Slipi'' from West Jakarta. Kebon Kacang area near Tanah Abang in Central Jakarta is renowned for its nasi uduk.

Nasi uduk is a popular dish for the busy commuters in Jakarta, mainly because it is affordable (one serving costs on average Rp10,000 or about US$0.77). It can be found throughout the day; some roadside stalls open exclusively in the morning, noon, or night, depending on the demographics of the surrounding area. Stalls near residential areas, marketplaces, train stations, and schools are usually open from morning to noon, while the ones near offices and street-side are usually open afternoon to midnight.

See also

 List of rice dishes
Nasi bogana
Nasi campur
Nasi goreng
Nasi kebuli
Nasi kucing
Nasi kuning
Nasi lemak
Nasi liwet
Nasi pecel
Nasi ulam

References

External links

 Jakarta Mixed Rice (Nasi Uduk) recipe

Indonesian rice dishes
Betawi cuisine
Foods containing coconut
Street food in Indonesia

ja:ナシウドゥッ